This article is a list of diseases of bananas and plantains (Musa spp.).

Bacterial diseases

Fungal diseases

Viral diseases

Nematodes, parasitic

Miscellaneous diseases and disorders

References

 Common Names of Diseases, The American Phytopathological Society (APS)

Banana